Gold Mountain is a  summit in the Blue Hills on the Kitsap Peninsula of Washington state, in the United States' Pacific Northwest.  It is the highest point on the Kitsap Peninsula and the highest point in Kitsap County, Washington, and nearby  Green Mountain is the second-highest point.

The mountain lies partly on private land, partly in the City of Bremerton watershed inaccessible to the general public, and partly in the adjacent  Green Mountain State Forest which is open to hikers, horses, and on- and off-road vehicles.

Most of the eastern half of Gold Mountain is in the city watershed, with the Union River reservoir at the foot. The summit itself is in a quarter quarter section exclave of the state forest, connected at a corner.

Radio and television transmitters
The mountain summit has an antenna farm including transmitters for Kitsap Peninsula area emergency services, as well as Seattle television and radio stations KCPQ (Fox 13), KTBW and KYFQ. Since 1981, the Western Washington Repeater Association has operated an amateur radio repeater, call sign WW7RA, on the site, with coverage throughout the Puget Sound region from Centralia to Bellingham.

A Continuously Operating Reference Station used for GPS-based geodesy is located at the KTBW site on the summit.

References

External links

 (1979 entry)
 (1992 entry)
Green Mountain State Forest, Washington State Department of Natural Resources
Hike of the Week: Green Mountain, The Olympian (2011)
Plans for Green Mountain, Tahuya state forests almost done, Kitsap Sun (2012)

Mountains of Washington (state)
Mountains of Kitsap County, Washington